Rubicon was an early 1990s offshoot of the band Fields of the Nephilim who released two albums.

What Starts, Ends on Atlantic Records and on Beggars Banquet Records in 1992 (catalogue reference - BBQ CD 128) was produced by Mark Freegard, and featured two singles: "Crazed" (BBQ 4CD) and "Before My Eyes" (BBQ 10CD).

Room 101 was released on Beggars Banquet in 1995. It was produced, engineered and mixed by Richard James Burgess under the pseudonym Caleb Kadesh.  The album featured the single "Insatiable" (BBQ47CD).

The brothers Wright later formed the band Last Rites.

Members
 Andy Delany – vocals
 Peter Yates – guitar, keyboards
 Paul Wright – guitar
 Tony Pettitt – bass guitar
 (Alexander) Nod Wright – drums, percussion, keyboards

Discography

References

English gothic rock groups
Atlantic Records artists
Beggars Banquet Records artists